Kisangani is a commune in the center of Kisangani city, the capital of Tshopo province, in the Democratic Republic of the Congo.

References 

Kisangani
Communes of the Democratic Republic of the Congo